Kristyan Benedict (born 1974 in Lancashire, United Kingdom) is crisis response manager for Amnesty International UK (AIUK). His main area of responsibility is Syria.

While working for AIUK, Benedict has been involved in grassroots activism. For example, he has helped plant olive trees and has dined with Palestinian families and listened to their stories.

Early life and education
Benedict was born in Lancashire and is of Indian and Trinidadian descent. He received a master's degree in communication, culture and society at Goldsmiths, University of London, in 1997.

Career
Benedict joined Amnesty International UK in 2003. He has worked as the organization's Middle East Campaign Manager and as Campaign Manager for China.

He became campaigns manager in 2006. He is the campaign manager for Crisis work with a focus on Syria at AIUK, which means that his primary professional responsibility is for Syria. Nonetheless, he spends “a significant amount of his time as an advocate for the human rights of Palestinians and Israelis caught up in the long running conflict.”

Syria
After UK Foreign Secretary William Hague announced in August 2012 that the UK would be aiding Syrian opposition groups, Benedict said: “Practical measures which aim to protect all of Syria's civilians are to be welcomed.” He encouraged the UK to help “develop the awareness and mechanisms to ensure the armed opposition leadership make clear to their forces that war crimes and human rights abuses will never be tolerated.”

He added that the UK “needs to be crystal clear with the commanders of Syria’s armed opposition that they have a duty to prevent war crimes by those under their command. The UK should also emphasise to them that they may be held criminally responsible if they fail to do so.” He summed up by saying that AI “wants to see a Syria which genuinely respects and protects everybody’s human rights” and that “instilling and expanding human rights values in the armed and civilian opposition is a key part of that process.”

"We are telling the Syria opposition that the Geneva Conventions covers them as organised armed groups and they will be held responsible for what they do and what they fail to prevent," Benedict told The Daily Telegraph in August 2012. "We have seen video of people being executed with machineguns - clearly that's a war crime."

After FSA fighters killed bound captives from the Berri clan in Aleppo in August 2012, Benedict said that to applaud that crime while claiming to support human rights in Syria “is a gross hypocrisy”.

In November 2012, after Hague met with Syrian opposition figures in London, Benedict commented that Hague “must insist on practical actions not just fine words to prevent opposition abuses. We need to see proper accountability with any fighters accused of abuses detained and proper investigations mounted.”

In a March 2013 article about the ongoing crisis in Syria, Benedict turned the focus to Israel, writing that "some Syrian opposition activists, fighters and politicians have suggested the reason arms are not flowing from the UK and the US to the 'Free Syrian Army' is because the 'West wants to protect Israel'." He commented that it was "not unreasonable" to hypothesize that "a possible 'threat' to Israelis enters into the strategic calculations of the US, UK and others," and complained that the US takes a "near non existent human rights approach...to the wider Israel / Palestine issue."

Benedict went on to rehearse the history of Israeli's occupation of the Golan Heights, declaring that the "establishment and retention of civilian settlements in occupied territory violates international law"  and calling on the US, UK, and other countries to address "the matter of long standing Israeli government impunity."

Criticism of Israel
Benedict, has argued that the Israeli-Palestinian conflict has persisted because the U.S. "plays both Arab and Israel sides to generate money, power and control." He has compared Israel to apartheid South Africa and the Soviet Union, and has implied that he looks forward to Israel's system of oppression falling as those countries systems of oppression fell. He has coordinated a number of anti-Zionist/pro-Palestinian events for AIUK according to Zionist government organisations, and in several of these cases he has collaborated with British journalist and author Ben White.

In a March 2011 news release written by Benedict, AIUK accused Israel of "ignoring" the "victims" in Gaza for over two years and asked the UN Security Council to refer the Gaza situation to the International Criminal Court.

"Israel," he said in a 2012 interview, "is now included in the list of stupid dictatorial regimes who abuse peoples’ basic universal rights – along with Burma, North Korea, Iran and Sudan, its government has the same wanton attitude to human beings." He attributed to its current government "a feeling of 'ethnic supremacy'" and described Israelis as being afflicted by "blatant racism," comparing their attitudes to those of “the BNP members in the north of England.” He said that Jewish settlers in Hebron throw "bottles, sticks and bags filled with liquid – sometimes their own urine" from the windows of their flats onto Palestinian passersby. And he accused Israel of hiding the truth about conditions on the Gaza Strip from the foreign media.

When asked by The Jewish Chronicle newspaper if Amnesty would be urging action on behalf of Gilad Shalit, an Israeli soldier held captive in Gaza, Benedict said that this could be done but changed the subject to the thousands of Palestinian prisoners held by Israel, saying that "We will have to do that if we want to be consistent." He responded to charges of being one-sided or anti-Semitic by pro-Israeli government organisations by insisting that his views are founded in international human rights law and international humanitarian law.

"Amnesty," he said, "is not worried about being accused of bias in the face of obvious atrocious human rights violations. We have a passion against all forms of injustice in the world. As for those who loosely throw about the term anti-Semitism as an attempt to gag us, we tell them to take their concerns to the Israeli government. The real delegitimising of Israel is its government’s behaviour when they act outside of the law."

He added: "I think those in the Israeli government, who are fanatical, think that if they can make life miserable enough then the Palestinians will leave. The blockade of Gaza has turned it into an outdoor prison." He has also claimed, in line with Amnesty International research on the issue, that Israel has engaged in a "deliberate denial of water" to Palestinians in Gaza "as a means of expelling them from the land."

Benedict described the Israeli government in 2012 as being "more right-wing" than before "and less tolerant of the human rights narrative we give," and expressed agreement with the statement in the 2009 Goldstone Report that Israel's "treatment of Palestine is meant to punish, humiliate and terrorize."

In tweets sent out in late 2012, Benedict wrote such things as: "How soon before Israel brings out the flechettes & white phosphorus given that 'All options are on the table'?" and "Israel continues to 'defend' its apartheid state by bombing families in#Gaza. Palestinians will not sit back and receive your death wishes." NGO Monitor documented that he called Operation Pillar of Defense "Israel’s murder campaign" and advocated BDS.

2008 China comment
“With dissenters silenced within China it's more important than ever that pressure comes from outside the country,” Benedict said in 2008. “We'd encourage anyone involved in the [Beijing Olympic] Games to find out what's really happening in China and to consider speaking out against human rights abuses.”

2011 comment to audience member
A 2011 article charging that AI has undergone a “moral decline,” and quoting Christopher Hitchens on its “degeneration and politicization,” maintained that “Amnesty's UK branch has a particular anti-Israel obsession,” and cited an AIUK event at which an audience member who writes a pro Israeli government blog who challenged a claim about a purported Israeli action was told by Benedict that he would “smack me in my little bald head.” The audience member posted an audio recording of the exchange online.

2012 B52 tweet
In November 2012 Benedict drew criticism for a tweet that was alleged to be anti-Semitic by pro Israeli government commentators.  In the context of a British parliamentary discussion on violence in Syria and Gaza, he singled out three Jewish MPs for supporting Israel's campaign against Hamas.  The tweet read “Louise Ellman, Robert Halfon and Luciana Berger walk into a bar… each orders a round of B52s… #Gaza.” A B52 is a type of long-range strategic bomber, but it is also the name of a popular cocktail. It was reported that after the tweet, AIUK “launched a disciplinary process,” saying that “the matter has been referred to our internal and confidential processes.” AI campaigns director Tim Hancock said, “We do not believe that humor is appropriate in the current circumstances, particularly from our own members of staff.”The organisation did not consider the tweet in question anti-Semitic though and Benedict continues to work at Amnesty International UK.

Benedict deleted the tweet from his account. This controversy came at a time when many critics, including the UK’s Zionist Federation, were criticizing what they called Benedict's “one-sided view of the conflict.” Jeremy Newmark, chief executive of the Jewish Leadership Council (JLC), accused Benedict of insensitivity and called on him to issue a public apology. In a letter to Amnesty International, MP John Mann, chairman of the “All-Party Parliamentary Group Against Antisemitism,” said the tweet had crossed the line between legitimate criticism and anti-Semitism. Responding to criticism of his tweeted “joke,” Benedict argued that it was merely coincidental that he had named three Jewish MPs and insisted that he focused on “views not religion.”

2012 ZF accusation
In 2012 the Zionist Federation of the United Kingdom (ZF) accused Benedict of a demonstrated anti-Israel bias, saying he had “regularly shown a partisan approach” when dealing with the country.

2012 Kurd criticism
In February 2012 Benedict was criticized by some Kurds when he refused to allow Kurdish activists to participate in a planned “Arab spring solidarity rally.” When a Kurdish protester asked Benedict to include a Kurd, Benedict walked away having explained all speakers were on a set list and nobody new could be added.

Events
In April 2005, Benedict conducted an interview with Saverio Contanzo, the director of “Private,” a film that is highly critical of Israeli soldiers and of Israeli policies in the Occupied Territories. Benedict described the film as showing “a family subjected to a violation of their privacy, family life, home and dignity”

In May 2009 Benedict chaired a discussion forum focused on learning from bereaved families in Israel and the “Occupied Palestinian Territories.”

In September 2009, Benedict hosted an event featuring Jeff Halper, director of the Israeli Committee Against House Demolitions and critic of Israel's “apartheid strategy.” According to an account of the event, “Halper gave irrefutable evidence of Israel’s apartheid strategy which is to deny any possibility of an independent Palestinian State.” Halper also called on President Obama to order Israel to retreat to its 1967 borders.

In July 2010, Benedict promoted an AIUK event featuring Combatants for Peace, a group devoted to ending the Israeli "occupation" of Palestinian territories. "What Combatants for Peace’s members are doing is remarkable," Benedict said, "and we support them in their aim of seeing Israelis and Palestinians living peacefully together with their human rights and dignity respected and protected."

In April 2011, Benedict chaired a screening of "War Child," a movie which focuses on the child survivors of Operation Cast Lead and "gives a voice to those whose lives were changed forever through the tragedy of war."

In April 2012, Benedict was one of the key speakers at an event hosted by the Palestine Film Foundation in association with AIUK and Adalah: The Legal Centre for Arab Minority Rights in Israel. After a screening of three short films, Benedict and Adalah lawyer Suhad Bishara discussed “threats faced by Palestinians in Israel today.”

References

1974 births
Living people
Amnesty International people
Alumni of Goldsmiths, University of London
People from Lancashire